George Frederick Shrady may refer to:

George Frederick Shrady Sr. (1837–1907), American physician
George Frederick Shrady Jr. (1862–1933), his son, coroner